This article is a listing of major precision rifle variants used by snipers from around the world.

A hunting or precision rifle equipped with a telescopic optic has been long described as a sniper rifle. Below is the list of precision rifles used by both military and law enforcement trained snipers and marksmen.

See also
 List of books, articles and documentaries about snipers
 List of assault rifles
 List of battle rifles
 List of carbines
 List of bolt-action rifles
 List of straight-pull rifles
 List of pump-action rifles
 List of rifles
 List of pistols
 Sniper equipment

References

sniper rifle